Redheads is an Australian brand of matches, originally manufactured by Bryant and May in Richmond, Victoria, but now manufactured in Sweden by Swedish Match. It is Australia's top-selling match brand.

Matches were first produced in Australia in 1909. Initially they were made of white phosphorus.

In 1946 Bryant & May began making safety matches in Australia, using red phosphorus as the striking surface. The Redhead name refers to the red striking-heads of the matches, which were first sold in Australia in 1947.

The logo on the matchbox depicts the head and right shoulder of a redheaded woman, and has had four major updates since its introduction, with a number of special issues also produced.

See also
Bryant and May Factory, Melbourne
Dickheads (brand)

References

External links

Australian brands
Matches (firelighting)